"What She Wants" is a song written by Renee Armand and Kerry Chater and recorded by American country music artist Michael Martin Murphey.  It was released in November 1984 as the lead single from his compilation album The Best of Michael Martin Murphey.  The song peaked at number 8 on the U.S. Billboard Hot Country Singles & Tracks chart and at number 6 on the Canadian RPM Country Tracks chart.

Music video
A music video was released to promote the song and it stars Murphey and his wife Mary. The video, directed by David Hogan, is designed to call attention to the growing plight of runaway children.

Chart performance

References

1984 singles
Michael Martin Murphey songs
Songs written by Kerry Chater
Song recordings produced by Jim Ed Norman
Music videos directed by David Hogan
Liberty Records singles
1984 songs